Classmates  is a Marathi language film directed by Aditya Sarpotdar starring Ankush Choudhary, Sai Tamhankar, Sachit Patil, Tushar Kamble, Sonalee Kulkarni and Siddharth Chandekar.
The film is an official remake of 2006 Malayalam film, with the same name. The film is set in 1995. The trailer was released on 28 October 2014.

Cast
 Ankush Choudhary as Satya
 Sai Tamhankar as Appu
 Sachit Patil as Rohit
 Sonalee Kulkarni as Aditi
 Sushant Shelar as Pratap
 Siddharth Chandekar as Ani
 Suyash Tilak as Amit
 Pallavi Patil as Heena
 Ramesh Deo as Samar Raje Nimbalkar
 Raju Pandit
 Sanjay Mone as Rohit's father
 Kishori Shahane as College Principal and Mother of Ani

Plot
Satya is a last year student and a college leader from "yuva shakti party". Ani is a first year student and a very cool and fun loving boy and Satya's friend. Aditi Nimbalkar is the niece of a politician. Appu is a rough girl and Satya's right hand. She loves Satya. Rohit is also a last year student and a swimmer. Ani has an ambition to build music section in college. In the beginning, Satya and Aditi hate each other but later, they fell in love with each other. During this, elections begin and Rohit decides that Aditi is going to oppose Satya in elections. The turning point of the story is Ani's death.

Soundtrack

Music of the film is composed by Amitraj, Troy Arif, Avinash-Vishwajeet and Pankaj Padghan with lyrics are penned by Mandar Cholkar, Satyajeet Ranade, Guru Thakur and Kshitij Patwardhan.

The first single from the film "Teri Meri Yaariyan" was released on YouTube on 7 November 2014. The second song "Bindhast Bedhadak" was released on 24 November 2014 on 9x Jhakaas.

Track listing

Reception

Mihir Bhanage from The Times of India wrote that "On the whole, it wouldn’t be wrong to say that 2015 has started on a high note with the first two releases pulling crowd to theatres and living up to the expectations. We hope the trend continues and we have more gems to watch on the silver screen" Soumitra Pote from Maharashtra Times Wrote "The most important thing is the artist. All the artists worked hard. Overall, this movie is made using all kinds of spices. Sufficient expenditure has been made for this. He dyes. But there is not much innovation in it. As Mahashi puts it, when you walk out of the theater, you feel like you have seen per worldliness"
Loksatta wrote "All the artists have portrayed their personalities in a good way. Good acting is the strength of this film"

References

External links
 

2015 films
Marathi remakes of Malayalam films
Indian buddy films
2010s Marathi-language films
Films directed by Aditya Sarpotdar